Linos is the name shared by various characters in Greek mythology.

Linos may also refer to:

 Linos (given name), a masculine given name
 Linos (Mysia), a town of ancient Mysia, now in Turkey
 Linos (operating system), an embedded distribution of Linux

See also

 Lino (disambiguation)
 Linus (disambiguation)
 Lions (disambiguation)